The 2006–07 season was Chelsea F.C.'s 93rd competitive season, 15th consecutive season in the Premier League and 101st year as a club. Managed by José Mourinho, the club won both the FA Cup and the League Cup.

Chelsea were in race to win a unique Quadruple until 1 May. The 2006–07 Premier League was decided on matchday 36, after Chelsea failed to win against Arsenal at the Emirates Stadium. This left them seven points behind Manchester United with two games to go, confirming Manchester United as league champions.

The season was their fourth under the ownership of Roman Abramovich and Chelsea spent heavily in the transfer market before the season. Notable transactions include the signing of Andriy Shevchenko from Milan for £30 million and Salomon Kalou from Feyenoord for an undisclosed fee. They also added Michael Ballack from Bayern Munich on free transfer and also exchanged William Gallas and £5 million with Arsenal for Ashley Cole.

In the Champions League, Chelsea aimed to improve upon their first knockout round exit in the previous season. They managed to reach the semi-finals for the third time in four seasons, but lost to Liverpool 4–1 on penalties after a 1–1 aggregate scoreline. Chelsea also lost the pre season Community Shield to Liverpool at the beginning of the season.

Kits 
Supplier: Adidas / Sponsor: Samsung Mobile

Management

First team squad
Squad at end of season

Left club during season

Reserve squad

Transfers

In

Out

Overall transfer activity

Total spending
Summer:  £56,600,000

Winter:  £0,000,000

Total:  £56,600,000

Income
Summer:  £31,000,000

Winter:  £0,000,000

Total:  £31,000,000

Expenditure
Summer:  £25,800,000

Winter:  £0,000,000

Total:  £25,800,000

Competitions

FA Community Shield

Premier League

League table

Matches

UEFA Champions League

Group stage

Knockout phase

Round of 16

Quarter-finals

Semi-finals

Football League Cup

FA Cup

Statistics

Appearances and goals

|}

Summary

Related media
Chelsea supporter Mark Worrall chronicled the 2006–07 season in his critically acclaimed book One Man Went To Mow, which was first published in January 2008 and documented the manager José Mourinho's last full season as manager at Stamford Bridge.

References

External links

Chelsea F.C. seasons
Chelsea